Coral Harbour (Inuktitut: Salliq/Salliit, Syllabics: ᓴᓪᓕᖅ/ᓴᓪᓖᑦ), is a small Inuit community that is located on Southampton Island, Kivalliq Region, in the Canadian territory of Nunavut. Its name is derived from the fossilized coral that can be found around the waters of the community which is situated at the head of South Bay. The name of the settlement in Inuktitut is Salliq, sometimes used to refer to all of Southampton Island. The plural Salliit, means large flat island(s) in front of the mainland.

History
The Sadlermiut ("inhabitants of Salliq") whose name is derived from Salliq previously occupied the area. The Sadlermiut are thought to be the last vestige of the Tuniit. The Tuniit, a pre-Inuit culture, officially went ethnically and culturally extinct in 1902-03 when a Western illness killed all of the Sadlermiut in a matter of weeks. However, others believe that the Sadlermiut were in fact descendants of the Thule, whose geographically isolated culture would have developed idiosyncratically from the mainland Thule culture. A third theory indicates that the Sadlermiut did not necessarily belong to either group, but because of intermarriage, their roots may have in fact been part of both Dorset and Thule cultures.

At the beginning of the 20th century, the area was repopulated by Aivilingmiut, whose name was to be later adapted for the Aivilik electoral district, from the Repulse Bay and Chesterfield Inlet areas, influenced to do so by whaler Captain George Comer and others. Baffin Islanders arrived 25 years later. John Ell, who as a young child travelled with his mother Shoofly on Comer's schooners, eventually became the most famous of Southampton Island's re-settled population.

Demographics 

Coral Harbour is the only Nunavut community that does not observe daylight saving time, remaining on Eastern Standard Time year-round.

Transportation
The only way to reach this community is by aircraft at Coral Harbour Airport or by water (such as the resupply barges, which do not carry passengers, that come from Churchill, Manitoba and the East coast and St. Lawrence area, every summer) and the main transportation on the island itself (nearly the same size as Switzerland) is by snowmobile and dog sled in the winter and all-terrain vehicle in the summer. Despite the harsh climate there is plentiful wildlife around the island. Among some of the species found there are walruses, polar bears, barren-ground caribou, ringed seals, gyrfalcons, and (rarely) peregrine falcons.

Broadband communications 
The community has been served by the Qiniq network since 2005. Qiniq is a fixed wireless service to homes and businesses, connecting to the outside world via a satellite backbone. The Qiniq network is designed and operated by SSI Micro. In 2017, the network was upgraded to 4G LTE technology, and 2G-GSM for mobile voice.

Notable residents

 James Arvaluk, Nunavut's first Minister of Education and former member of the Legislative Assembly of Nunavut for Tununiq, represented Pond Inlet. Arvaluk had previously been elected in Nanulik representing the hamlets of Chesterfield Inlet and Coral Harbour. Prior to 1 April 1999 division of the Northwest Territories he served as a member of the Legislative Assembly of the Northwest Territories for the Aivilik (now split between Rankin Inlet North, Akulliq and Nanulik) electoral district.
 Tagak Curley, founder and first president Inuit Tapiriit Kanatami (Inuit Tapirisat of Canada). Curley is currently a member of the Legislative Assembly of Nunavut for Rankin Inlet North. Prior to division he represented Keewatin South and Aivilik and also stood as the Liberal candidate in the 1979 election for the Nunatsiaq (now Nunavut) riding.
 Patterk Netser, former member of the Legislative Assembly of Nunavut for Nanulik.
 Pudlo Pudlat, notable artist who was born on Baffin Island but lived in the Coral Harbour area until the age of six.
 Manitok Thompson, former member of the Legislative Assembly of Nunavut for Rankin Inlet South/Whale Cove, and prior to division, of the Legislative Assembly of the Northwest Territories for Aivilik. She was Nunavut's first female cabinet minister.

Climate
Coral Harbour has a severe subarctic climate (Köppen Dfc), for which it just qualifies due to its  July means. It is a borderline polar climate, which results in barren vegetation. Coral Harbour has never gone above freezing in January, February and March (although the latter has recorded ). Due to the frozen nature of Hudson Bay, there is a severe seasonal lag until June despite much sunshine and perpetual twilight at night. Due to the drop of solar strength and the absence of warm water even in summer, temperatures still drop off very fast as September approaches, with only July and August having ever recorded temperatures above . Cold extremes are severe, but in line with many areas even farther south in Canada's interior. Unlike those areas, Coral Harbour remains beneath  in terms of average high in the midst of winter.

Throughout December 2010 and early January 2011, Nunavut, northern Quebec and western Greenland set many high temperature records. The daily minimum temperature on 6 January 2011, was about  warmer than normal. The unusual warmth was due largely to an unseasonal area of high pressure over Greenland, and very negative values of the Arctic oscillation and North Atlantic oscillation. Mostly in the 21st century, the conditions have combined to produce an Arctic dipole anomaly that brings warm air to the Arctic regions and cold air to the continents.

Geological resources 
The limestone around Coral Harbour (and nearby regions of Bad Cache Rapids) predominantly have a "Low Purity" value for industrial use.

See also
List of municipalities in Nunavut

References

Further reading

 Bower, Margaret E. Aeromagnetic Surveys Across Hudson Bay from Churchill to Coral Harbour and Churchill to Great Whale River. Dept. of Mines and Technical Surveys, Canada, 1960.
 Feheley Fine Arts (Toronto). Contemporary Coral Harbour. Toronto, Ont: Feheley Fine Arts, 2002.
 Aldene Meis Mason, Leo Paul Dana, and Robert Brent Anderson, "Entrepreneurship in Coral Harbour, Nunavut" International Journal of Entrepreneurship and Innovation 9 (2), June 2008, pp. 1–10.

External links

 The Atlas of Canada: Coral Harbour
The Coral Harbour website

Ports and harbours of Nunavut
Populated places on Hudson Bay
Hamlets in the Kivalliq Region
Road-inaccessible communities of Nunavut